These are the official results of the Men's Javelin Throw event at the 2001 World Championships in Edmonton, Alberta, Canada. There were a total number of 27 participating athletes, with the final held on Sunday August 12, 2001. The qualification mark was set at 84.00 metres.

Medalists

Schedule
All times are Mountain Standard Time (UTC-7)

Abbreviations
All results shown are in metres

Records

Qualification

Group A

Group B

Final

See also
 1998 Men's European Championships Javelin Throw (Budapest)
 2000 Men's Olympic Javelin Throw (Sydney)
 2002 Men's European Championships Javelin Throw (Munich)
 2004 Men's Olympic Javelin Throw (Athens)

References
 Results
 koti.welho
 IAAF

J
Javelin throw at the World Athletics Championships